Günter Schmahl (26 March 1936 – 14 August 2018) was a German physicist, professor at the University of Göttingen and a pioneer of X-ray microscopy.

The main focus of Schmahl's work, and his most important achievement, was the development of full-field soft X-ray microscopy. He was one of the first to recognize the potential of this method and to identify and follow the technological approach of using zone plates as lenses in such a microscope. Schmahl and his collaborators further developed the technique until it was ready for application in two- and three-dimensional imaging of biological samples.

Schmahl founded the Institute for X-ray Physics at the University of Göttingen and headed it until his retirement in 2002. He was also one of the founders and the first organizer of the International Conference on X-Ray Microscopy, which has been held every three years since 1983 and biennially since 2008.

Honors and awards 

 1985: Lower Saxony State Prize, category Science
 1992: Röntgen Medal of the city of Remscheid
 1995: Röntgen Award of the Department of Physics and Crystallography at the University of Würzburg
 Since 1996: Member of the Göttingen Academy of Sciences and Humanities
 2005: Advanced Photon Source Compton Award, Argonne National Laboratory, Argonne, Illinois (together with Janos Kirz)

Selected publications 

<references group="P">

References

External links
Obituary by Tim Salditt in the yearbook of the Göttingen Academy of Sciences and Humanities. 

1936 births
2018 deaths
Academic staff of the University of Göttingen
21st-century German physicists
20th-century German physicists
Optical engineers
Members of the Göttingen Academy of Sciences and Humanities